Senator McAllister may refer to:

Matthew Hall McAllister (1800–1865), Georgia State Senate
Norman H. McAllister (born 1951), Vermont State Senate
Thomas Stanislaus McAllister (1878–1950), Northern Irish Senate
William M. McAllister (1896–1986), Oregon State Senate

See also
Hill McAlister (1875–1959), Tennessee State Senate